Moss Side is a suburban, semi-rural community on the western side of Leyland, Lancashire, in the borough of South Ribble, England.  The suburb is growing. It is adjacent to Bretherton, Ulnes Walton and Midge Hall.

There is a Scouts group in the area and a concert party who perform for senior citizens. There are bowling and running groups in the community as well.

There were plans to build a new Redrow apartment development, but local residents fought a determined campaign to oppose this and planning permission was ultimately refused in December 2005.

A new ball court and a children's playground were completed in 2005 and a better community is coming together overall.

Moss Side has seen an increase in community involvement in recent years. This has delivered benefits such as the Moss Side Community Newsletter, a Moss Side football team and the new 'Your Moss Side' website.

Features of the area

Public houses
 Dunkirk Hall
 Black Bull (demolished 2015 - replaced with housing)

Schools
 St James School
 Moss Side School on Paradise Lane. This school received "Outstanding Standard" in all areas of 2006 and again in 2008 and 2009 Ofsted Report and celebrated its 25th birthday in May 2007, under the command of Mrs J. Burdin who had been Head since day one. On 27 October 2017 it was announced Mrs Burdin will step down on 22 December 2017. The current headteacher is Mr A Wright, who was previously a teacher. Mrs Burdin received an MBE for services to education in 2019.

Churches
 St James Church - presided over by The Revd Marc A.M. Wolverson

Moss Side Community Centre
 Used for playgroup and by other groups and individuals.
 Previously used for Moss Side "Pioneers" youth club run by local volunteers.

Shops
 Co-op late shop
 McColls newsagents & post office (closed down 2017) 
 Moss Side Tanning Studio (closed down 2017)
 New Territories Takeaway (closed down) 
 Wise Pharmacy
Ocean Fish & Chips
My Vet Veterinary Practice

Industrial estate
Just north of the Moss Side village centre is Moss Side Industrial Estate, primarily known for Schwan Consumer Brand's Chicago Town Pizza, and the former Leyland Trucks vehicle test track. B&D Print also operate their offices at the industrial estate.

There are links to both the B5248 and B5253 roads (leading to A582 and M65) creating adequate travel links while avoiding heavy traffic through the village.

References 

Geography of South Ribble
Leyland, Lancashire